August Ames (born Mercedes Grabowski; 23 August 1994 – 5 December 2017) was a Canadian pornographic actress. She appeared in more than 100 films, including a non-pornographic film in 2016, and was nominated for several AVN Awards. In 2017, at the age of 23, Ames died of suicide after a social media backlash following a tweet she posted.

Early life
Ames was born Mercedes Grabowski in Antigonish, Nova Scotia, on August 23, 1994. She grew up in Petawawa, Ontario, and later lived in Colorado Springs, Colorado. Both her parents were in the army and she spent her early years as a military brat, including a number of years living beside Canadian Forces Base Petawawa.

Ames alleged that she was routinely sexually molested by her paternal grandfather as a child, but her father refused to believe her and at 12 years old she was sent to live in a group home. In her early years, she worked as a nanny, animal-assisted aide, and horseback trainer.

Career
Ames's career as a pornographic actress began at the age of 19, in November 2013. She has over 100 IMDb credits including productions by companies such as Brazzers, Elegant Angel, Evil Angel, Girlfriends Films, Jules Jordan Video, New Sensations and Sweetheart Video. She was nominated for four AVN Awards in her lifetime, including three nominations for Female Performer of the Year.

In 2016, she appeared in the non-pornographic film Model for Murder: The Centerfold Killer.

Personal life
Ames married Kevin Moore, a pornography producer and director for Evil Angel.

Weeks prior to her death, Ames said that she had a history of bipolar depressive disorder and dissociative identity disorder (multiple personality) due to a traumatic childhood, stating: "Some days I'll be fine and if I'm not doing anything I'll get these awful flashbacks of my childhood and I get very depressed and I can't get out of bed and cancel my scenes for like a week or two."

Death
In December 2017, Ames was due to perform in a pornographic scene, but withdrew when she learned that the co-star was a man who had appeared in gay pornography. On December 3, 2017, Ames wrote on Twitter:

The tweet drew criticism and abuse from social media users. Jaxton Wheeler, a pansexual performer, demanded that Ames apologize or take a cyanide pill, which he later said he regretted. Ames, who was bisexual, defended her right to exercise her sexual autonomy in a subsequent tweet.

On December 5, 2017, two days after her tweet, Ames was found dead in a park in Camarillo, California, at the age of 23. Her death was ruled a suicide due to asphyxia by hanging by the Ventura County Medical Examiner's Office. Upon her autopsy, toxicology results revealed that she had cocaine, marijuana, the antidepressant Sertraline (Zoloft), and the anxiolytic alprazolam (Xanax)  in her system at her time of death. Close friends stated that cyberbullying led to her suicide.

An investigation into her suicide was covered in the Audible series The Last Days of August by journalist Jon Ronson after her husband, Kevin Moore, encouraged Ronson and his producer to look into the cyberbullying that he claimed had led to Ames's death. In the podcast, Ronson investigates the cyberbullying aspect of the story but then goes further and looks more closely at Moore's role in Ames's death by examining his prior relationships and Ames's history of mental illness.  Ronson concludes that a number of people around Ames contributed to the poor mental state that led to her death and draws comparisons between Ames's suicide and the fictional suicide of the young girl in J. B. Priestley's play An Inspector Calls (1945).

In the wake of Ames's death and the deaths of several other adult performers that year, several initiatives within the industry were proposed to deal with the issue, including The August Project, a hotline conceived by Moore, and Pineapple Support, a non-profit organization launched in April 2018 by British performer Leya Tanit.

References

External links

 Podcast: the Last Days of August
 

1994 births
2017 suicides
Actresses from Colorado Springs, Colorado
Bisexual pornographic film actresses
Black Canadian LGBT people
Bullying and suicide
American pornographic film actresses
Canadian people of Polish descent
Canadian emigrants to the United States
Female suicides
LGBT adult models
Canadian LGBT actors
American LGBT actors
LGBT people from Colorado
People from Antigonish, Nova Scotia
People with bipolar disorder
Suicides by hanging in California
Victims of cyberbullying
21st-century Canadian LGBT people
21st-century American women